The Last Billionaire (French: Le dernier milliardaire)  is a 1934 French comedy film directed by René Clair and starring Max Dearly, Marthe Mellot and Renée Saint-Cyr. The film is based on a fictional small European kingdom which is on the verge of going broke.

It was shot at the Joinville Studios in Paris. The film's sets were designed by the art directors Lucien Aguettand and Lucien Carré. It was the last film Clair made in France until 1947, as he moved to Britain and then the United States.

Cast
 Max Dearly as Banco
 Marthe Mellot as Queen of Casinario
 Renée Saint-Cyr as Princess Isabelle
 Sinoël as Prime Minister
 Charles Redgie as Crown Prince Nicolas
 Marcel Carpentier as Detective Brown
 Paul Ollivier as Chamberlain
 Raymond Cordy as Valet
 José Noguero as Bandleader
 Raymond Aimos as Le mendiant
 Christian Argentin as Le ministre des finances
 Jean Aymé as Un ministre
 Eddy Debray as Un ministre

References

Bibliography 
 Dudley Andrew. Mists of Regret: Culture and Sensibility in Classic French Film. Princeton University Press, 1995.

External links

1934 films
1934 comedy films
1930s French-language films
French black-and-white films
Films directed by René Clair
French comedy films
Pathé films
Films shot at Joinville Studios
1930s French films